The 1983 Ginny Championships was a women's tennis tournament played on indoor carpet courts at the Neal S. Blaisdell Center in Honolulu, Hawaii in the United States. It was the final of the Ginny Tournament Circuit that was part of the 1983 Virginia Slims World Championship Series.

It was the inaugural edition of the tournament and was held from November 7 through November 13, 1983. Second-seeded Kathleen Horvath won the singles title.

Finals

Singles
 Kathleen Horvath defeated  Carling Bassett-Seguso 4–6, 6–2, 7–6
 It was Horvath's 2nd title of the year and the 4th of her career.

Doubles
 Rosalyn Fairbank /  Candy Reynolds defeated  Lea Antonoplis /  Barbara Jordan 5–7, 7–5, 6–3
 It was Fairbank's 6th title of the year and the 9th of her career. It was Reynolds' 8th title of the year and the 16th of her career.

Notes

References

External links
 ITF tournament edition details
 Tournament fact sheet

Port St. Lucie Open
Tennis tournaments in the United States
1983 in American tennis